Nathan Bedford Forrest was a Confederate General in the American Civil War.

Nathan Bedford Forrest may also refer to:
Nathan Bedford Forrest II (1872–1931), his grandson, leader of the Sons of Confederate Veterans and Grand Dragon the Second Era Ku Klux Klan
Nathan Bedford Forrest III (1905–1943), son of the above, general in World War II